At the 1960 Summer Olympics, fourteen different artistic gymnastics events were contested, eight for men and six for women.  All events were held in the Baths of Caracalla in Rome from September 5 through 10th.

Format of competition
The scoring in the team competition and in the all-around was the same, as for gymnastics events at the previous Olympics (there was no team, portable apparatus event, however). But apart from two performances:a compulsory and an optional, which counted for both the team competition and the all-around, a gymnast, who competed in an apparatus final should show one's skills once more on the respective apparatus. For the final score ("Total" column in tables below), the compulsory routine's mark was added to the optional routine's, the result was divided by two ("Prelim" column) and added to the third routine's mark ("Final" column).

Results

Men's events

Women's events

Medal table

Total

Men

Women

References

External links

 

 
1960 Summer Olympics events
1960
1960 in gymnastics